Peter Osborne may refer to:
 Sir Peter Osborne, 17th Baronet (born 1943), British businessman and father of George Osborne
 Peter Osborne (philosopher) (born 1958), writer and an academic teaching philosophy at Kingston University
 Peter Osborne (Keeper of the Privy Purse) (1521–1592), Keeper of the Privy Purse to King Edward VI
 Peter Osborne (1584–1653), English administrator and Member of Parliament

See also
 Peter Oborne (born 1957), British journalist
 Osborne (disambiguation)